Silas Feitosa Jose De Souza (born March 8, 1985) known as Silas, is a Brazilian footballer who plays for São Bernardo. He formerly played for clubs including Gostaresh Foolad F.C.

Club career
De Souza joined Gostaresh Foolad F.C. in 2010, and scored the second goal for the club in their Hazfi Cup semifinal victory over Zob Ahan F.C. He then returned to Brazil where he played for Bragantino in Série B and for São Bernardo in the Campeonato Paulista.

References

1985 births
Living people
Brazilian footballers
Expatriate footballers in Iran
Gostaresh Foulad F.C. players
Esporte Clube Bahia players
Guarani FC players
Association football defenders
People from São Bernardo do Campo
Footballers from São Paulo (state)